Ionășeni may refer to several villages in Romania:

 Ionășeni, a village in Trușești Commune, Botoșani County
 Ionășeni, a village in Vârfu Câmpului Commune, Botoșani County

See also 
 Ion (name)
 Ionești (disambiguation)